Rochelle is a city in Wilcox County, Georgia, United States. Per the 2020 census, the population was 1,167.

History
The community was named after La Rochelle, in France. The Georgia General Assembly incorporated Rochelle as a town in 1888.

Geography
Rochelle is located at  (31.948993, -83.453875).

Demographics

2020 census

Note: the US Census treats Hispanic/Latino as an ethnic category. This table excludes Latinos from the racial categories and assigns them to a separate category. Hispanics/Latinos can be of any race.

2000 Census
As of the census of 2000, there were 1,415 people, 552 households, and 379 families residing in the city. The racial makeup of the city was 46.08% White, 52.79% African American, 0.35% Native American, 0.35% from other races, and 0.42% from two or more races. Hispanic or Latino of any race were 1.84% of the population.

There were 552 households, out of which 31.0% had children under the age of 18 living with them, 42.0% were married couples living together, 23.2% had a female householder with no husband present, and 31.3% were non-families. 28.8% of all households were made up of individuals, and 12.5% had someone living alone who was 65 years of age or older.  The average household size was 2.56 and the average family size was 3.14.

In the city, the population was spread out, with 29.2% under the age of 18, 8.8% from 18 to 24, 24.5% from 25 to 44, 23.7% from 45 to 64, and 13.9% who were 65 years of age or older.  The median age was 36 years. For every 100 females, there were 83.8 males.  For every 100 females age 18 and over, there were 77.7 males.

The median income for a household in the city was $21,923, and the median income for a family was $27,250. Males had a median income of $26,607 versus $19,250 for females. The per capita income for the city was $12,929.  About 28.5% of families and 36.2% of the population were below the poverty line, including 47.2% of those under age 18 and 26.1% of those age 65 or over.

Education 
The Wilcox County School District holds pre-school to grade twelve, and consists of one elementary school, a middle school, and a high school. The district has 90 full-time teachers and over 1,439 students.

The schools, located in Rochelle, are:
Wilcox County Elementary School
Wilcox County Middle School
Wilcox County High School

Higher education 
Wiregrass Georgia Technical College - Wilcox Learning Center

Notable people
John Bahnsen - United States Army brigadier general and decorated veteran of the Vietnam War
Alfonzo Dennard - NFL free agent
Nick Marshall - NFL cornerback for Jacksonville Jaguars, quarterback for Auburn Tigers
Bug Howard - NFL tight end for the Tampa Bay Buccaneers

References

Cities in Georgia (U.S. state)
Cities in Wilcox County, Georgia